Vein is the thirteenth album by Japanese experimental band Boris. The album was released on vinyl in October 2006 through Important Records and was limited to 1500 copies only. Vein became somewhat controversial for the long delays prior to the release  but most importantly for presenting two different albums under the album's title. As the label in charge of the release explained, "Every aspect of this beautiful release was planned and designed by Boris and they have stated that it has very special meaning for them".

In 2013, the band announced that the album would be released as a 2-CD set but that this was not a reissue of the album, but rather a re-arrangement of both albums combined. The label in charge of this release explained that this release sounds different from the previous versions. The album was packaged in two 3" CDs with the same printed outer edge as the vinyl release to make them appear to be traditional 5" CDs.

Part of track A7 of the hardcore vinyl version is used in the untitled final track of Smile. It is present unadulterated, but as an alternate, bass-heavy mix, on the Southern Lord US vinyl pressing of Smile as "VEIN;" it is thus removed from the untitled song. The 2013 CD pressing of Vein moves this to track 11 and is yet another mix, this one even incorporating the backwards guitar melody from the untitled Smile track. This creates a circle of sampling that intermingles the two albums.

History

In November 2004, first hints of the album were given by the label Important Records who, in a newsletter, informed that the band had just completed the recording of the then untitled album and more information was going to be released in the future. However, for more than a year, no information about the release was given until May 2006 when the label finally revealed concrete information about the album including the picture around the edges of the vinyl, the title, and estimated date of the release:

The label expressed some frustration with the many details involving this release, in particular, the vinyl itself. The label explained that in order to obtain the finished product they had to use a screen printed image on clear mylar in order to give the impression of clear vinyl with an image suspended within it. Additionally, the label expressed how even making the stickers for the album have been a challenge as they were designed on a custom size and require hand building a die to cut them. First attempts at this were unsuccessful with the image smudging when the vinyl was pressed over it.

The album continued to be delayed causing some frustration among fans and also for label who continued to have issues regarding the manufacturing of the vinyl, in particular with the "clear mylar" images which they had to abandon and find another solution instead. The final product was announced in August 2006 with a price hike because of these issues:

Only 1500 copies of the album were ever pressed which were distributed around the world and to the band who would sell some copies while on tour. The album sold out in around two months and those fans who were left out of the release were advised by the label to act fast and buy the copies distributed to third parties while once again apologizing for the lack of copies for everyone

Versions

During the two years that the album was being pressed and released, no information was ever given about two different versions of the album. Alternate recordings were confirmed shortly after the release, when various people proclaimed their Vein record had no vocals at all. Confusion about this issue was mainly because aesthetically, the packaging is identical on both records and the only way it can be differentiated is by inspecting the surface of the vinyl itself. One version, dubbed the "Hardcore version", was named as such for having elements of crust punk, hardcore, and drone. Additionally, the album features lead vocals by Atsuo for the first time in several years, with Takeshi contributing vocals in some of the songs as well. The vocals on this version of the record are notably different from most Boris albums, as they are screamed rather than sung. The other version, dubbed the "Noise version", was labeled as such for including elements of drone and noise music as well as punk. This version of the album does not include any vocals.

The hardcore version of the album also includes samples from two films by Russian director Andrei Tarkovsky. At the very beginning of the third track, the listener can hear a man say "И пусть посмеются над своими страстями" (Russian for "Let them laugh at their own passions") from the 1979 film Stalker, and on the beginning of the final track, the listener can hear a man say "I hela mitt liv har jag väntat på det här. Hela mitt liv har varit en enda väntan på det här." (Swedish for "All my life I've been waiting for this. My whole life has been a long wait for this."), a quote from the 1986 film, The Sacrifice.

The 2013 version of the album featured both versions of the original album combined and rearranged into 2 CDs. Due to the 3" CD time limitation, each disc only contains 18 minutes of music or less; as such, not every track from both vinyl versions is included. Perhaps the most interesting result is the final CD track, which combines both sides of the drone vinyl version into a single track. However, tracks 6 and 7 on the CD are new material unrelated to the vinyl versions.

In October 2020, Boris once again released a new mix of the album, this time as 48k24bit High-Resolution Audio digital files. This release is a combination of the original hardcore version and the 2013 2 CD reissue.

Track listing

Personnel

 Atsuo - Drums and Vocals
 Wata - Guitar and Effects
 Takeshi - Vocals, Bass, and Guitar
 Mastered by Souichirou Nakamura
 Produced by Boris
 Recorded and mixed by fangsanalsatan
 Hiroyuki Furuya - Illustration and Original Artwork
 fangsanalsatan - Artwork and Design (Reissue)

Pressing History

References

External links
 

2006 albums
Boris (band) albums
Important Records albums